Igor Aleksandrovich Soloshenko (born 22 May 1979) is a retired Kazakh football defender.

Career
Born in Karagandy, Soloshenko started his career in FC Shakhter in 1996, then played for FC Zhenis, FC Shakhter for a second time, FC Ayat and FC Tobol. He joined FC Shakhter for a third time in 2006. Soloshenko won the 2002 Kazakhstan Cup with Zhenis.

International
Soloshenko captained the Kazakhstan youth national team at the 1999 FIFA World Youth Championship in Nigeria and earned 11 caps for the senior Kazakhstan national football team from 1998 to 2005.

Career statistics

International

Statistics accurate as of match played 8 September 2007

References

External links

Profile at club website

1979 births
Living people
Kazakhstani footballers
Association football forwards
Kazakhstan international footballers
FC Shakhter Karagandy players
FC Tobol players
FC Zhenis Astana players
FC Okzhetpes players
FC Akzhayik players
Kazakhstan Premier League players
Footballers at the 1998 Asian Games
Asian Games competitors for Kazakhstan